Hamitköy Spor Kulübü is a Turkish Cypriot football club based in Hamitköy, Nicosia District.

Colors
The club colors are red and black.

Stadium
The club's home stadium is Hamitköy Stadyumu.

Notable players
 Orçun Karahüseyin
 Cemal Karamez
 Arinze Zakari Enemuo

Footnotes

Football clubs in Northern Cyprus